Ehud Ben Zvi (born 1951) is a historian of ancient Israel, esp. in the Achaemenid period, a scholar of the Hebrew Bible, with a focus on Social Memory. He is Professor Emeritus in the Department of History, Classics and Religion at the University of Alberta.

Ben Zvi graduated from the Hebrew University in Jerusalem with a BSc, the Open University of Israel with a BA, and Tel Aviv University, MA before obtaining his PhD from Emory University under Gene Tucker.

Ben Zvi’s has authored authored several volumes, including Social Memory among the Literati of Yehud (BZAW, 509; Berlin: de Gruyter 2019), History, Literature and Theology in the Book of Chronicles (London: Equinox, 2006), Hosea, (FOTL 21A, part 1; Grand Rapids, MI: Eerdmans, 2005), Signs of Jonah: Reading and Rereading in Ancient Yehud (JSOTSupS 367; Sheffield: Sheffield Academic Press/Continuum, 2003), and Micah, (FOTL 21b; Grand Rapids, MI: Eerdmans, 2000).

He has also edited and co-edited a substantial number of collected essays volumes (e.g., Remembering Biblical Figures in the Late Persian & Early Hellenistic Periods: Social Memory and Imagination [co-edited with Diana Edelman; Oxford: Oxford University Press, 2013]; Centres and Peripheries in the Early Second Temple Period  [co-edited with Christoph Levin; FAT, 108; Tübingen: Mohr-Siebeck, 2016]) and some special issues of journals (e.g., HebAI 9/4 (2020); Thematical Issue: Tōrâ-centred Israel. When a Yehudite Concept Met Ptolemaic Egypt [co-edited with Sylvie Honigman]). He has published numerous essays on social memory studies as they pertain to Ancient Israel, the historical and prophetic books of the Hebrew Bible. A list of his works can be accessed at https://sites.ualberta.ca/~ebenzvi/ebz-publications.html and at Ben Zvi's ORCID page.

Ben Zvi founded the Journal of Hebrew Scriptures in 1996 and served as its general editor until 2013. He was one of the founders and served as first chair of the SBL International Cooperation Initiative, 2006-2013, and was one of the two founding co-editors of Ancient Near Eastern Monographs (SBL). 

He served as president of the European Association of Biblical Studies from 2016 to 2018, and as president of the Canadian Society of Biblical Studies, 2001-2002 .  

In 2015, a Festschrift was published in his honor. History, Memory, Hebrew Scriptures: A Festschrift for Ehud Ben Zvi.

References

1951 births
Living people
Canadian biblical scholars
Old Testament scholars
Emory University alumni
Academic staff of the University of Alberta
Academic journal editors